Rewind is the debut EP by Chinese artist and Super Junior-M member Zhou Mi. It was released online on October 31, 2014, by S.M. Entertainment and distributed by KT Music, with a physical release on November 3, 2014.

Background and release
The mini album was officially released online on October 31, 2014, along with the music videos of "Rewind".

Composition
All Chinese songs were written by Zhou Mi. The Korean version of "Rewind" was written by Lee Yoo-jin and Oh Min-joo, while the Chinese version was written by Zhou Mi, Zhou Weijie, and Huang Zitao (Tao, ZTAO). The Korean version features a rap verse by Chanyeol of EXO-K, while the Chinese version features a rap verse by Tao of EXO-M. "Loving You" is a duet with Victoria of f(x).

Music video
The music video of the song features fellow label mates Chanyeol for the Korean version and Tao for the Chinese version. The video depicts Zhou Mi remembering moments with a previous girlfriend. Towards the end of the video, the girlfriend is shown destroying his room in a fit of anger, after reading what seem to be his diary.

Track listing
Credits adapted from the official homepage.

※ Bolded tracks indicate singles from the album.

Chart performance

Album

Singles

Sales

References

External links
  Zhou Mi's official website

2014 debut EPs
Albums produced by Lee Soo-man
SM Entertainment EPs
Genie Music EPs
Dance music EPs
Contemporary R&B EPs
Korean-language EPs
Chinese-language EPs